Li Fan was a Chinese astronomer during the Han Dynasty (202 BC-220 AD).

He noticed that the Moon does not move uniformly through its phases by using background stars as reference. In 85 Li Fan and Bian Xin were tasked by Emperor Zhang to resolve inaccuracies in the Taichu calendar. He is also known to have worked with inflow clepsydras as opposed to earlier, typically less accurate outflow clepsydras.

The measurements of synodic periods of the planets given in the following table are attributed to him.

An impact crater that is located at the Phaethontis quadrangle, Mars, 47.2°S Latitude and 153.2°W Longitude was named in his honor. The diameter of the impact crater is approximately 104.8 km.

References

Year of birth missing
Year of death missing
1st-century Chinese astronomers